David William Bacon (September 15, 1813 – November 5, 1874) was an American prelate of the Roman Catholic Church.  He served as the first bishop of the Diocese of Portland in Maine and New Hampshire from 1855 until his death in 1874.

Biography

Early life 
David Bacon was born on September 15, 1813, in New York City. He majored in classical studies at the Sulpician College of Montreal in Montreal, Quebec, and studied theology at Mount St. Mary's Seminary in Emmitsburg, Maryland. 

Bacon was ordained a priest for the Archdiocese of New York by Archbishop Samuel Eccleston in Baltimore, Maryland on December 13, 1838. Returning to New York, Bacon served on missions at Utica and Ogdensburg, then in New York City and in Belleville, New Jersey.

In 1841, Bacon was sent to Brooklyn, New York, to establish a third parish.  He bought an unfinished building for the parish church.  The building had been started in November 1831, as the "Independent Catholic Church" by the Reverend. John Farnan,  who had been suspended by Bishop John Dubois. The new Assumption of the Blessed Virgin Church was completed and dedicated on June 10, 1842.

Bishop of Portland 
On January 23, 1855, Bacon was named first bishop of the new Diocese of Portland by Pope Pius IX..  Bacon was consecrated by Archbishop John Joseph Hughes in St. Patrick's Cathedral, New York City, on April 22, 1855.
There were only six priests and eight churches in the  Portland diocese, which at that time included the entire states of Maine and New Hampshire. At his death the diocese contained 63 churches, 52 priests, 23 parish schools, and a Catholic population of about 80,000.

Death and legacy 
In the summer of 1874, Bacon sailed with Archbishop John McCloskey to Europe for a visit to Rome. After Bacon fell ill during the voyage, he was admitted to the Naval Hospital at Brest, France, while McCloskey continued to Rome. Bacon spend the summer and fall in the hospital. 

For the return trip to New York in November, McCloskey had Bacon carried on board the ship from the hospital.  Gravely ill, David Bacon died on November 5, 1874, in a New York City hospital, several hours after the ship docked. The bronze altar of the Sacred Heart in St. Patrick's Cathedral in Manhattan was erected by Archbishop McCloskey in thanks for Bacon's life being spared until he got back to the United States.

References

"U.S. Cath. Hist. Soc. Records and Studies" (New York, 1900), II, pts. I-II
 MITCHELL, "Golden Jubilee of Bishop Loughlin" (Brooklyn, 1891)
 MULRENAN, "A Brief Historical Sketch of the Catholic Church on Long Island" (New York, 1871)
 REUSS, "Biog. Cycl. Of the Cath. Hierarchy" (Milwaukee, Wis., 1898)
 SHEA, "Hist. Cath. Ch. In U.S." (New York, 1904)

1813 births
1874 deaths
Clergy from New York City
Roman Catholic bishops of Portland
19th-century Roman Catholic bishops in the United States
Participants in the First Vatican Council